Kristin Sevaldsen (born 10 January 1966 in Lillehammer, Norway) is a Norwegian Jazz musician (saxophone), composer, and music producer.

Career 
Sevaldsen has been band member and session musician for several years. In 2007 she released the debut solo album Impressions. The album gained very favorable reviews and the Kristin Sevaldsen Band played at several concert venues both in Norway and internationally.

In 2009 she released the psalm album Treasure, together with Lewi Bergrud and Dag Stokke, that the record company Naxos was awarded hymn album in 2009 and received good reviews from both the album and live concerts. The next solo album Transit was completed in 2011. The musicians of the set is Tom Erik Antonsen, Per Hillestad and Einar Thorbjørnsen.

The album Aftenstemning (2011) was released in collaboration with Norwegian folk musician Camilla Granlien. They have put new melodies and arrangements to poems by Bjørnson. Musicians are Morten Reppesgård, Jo F. Skaansar and Harald Skullerud. Besides her own music she contribute in multiple projects with the likes of Gaute Ormåsen and Cecilia Vennersten.

Otherwise she is doing studio sessions for other artists and creates music for film and theater. In 2012 she began postgraduate studies in film music composition at Lillehammer University College, and has already made her mark in the field.

Honors 
2013: Oppland county's Work grant for established artists

Discography

Solo albums 
2007: Impressions (D'Label)
2009: Treasure (D'Label), with Lewi Bergrud and Dag Stokke, including old Scandinavian psalms and hymns
2011: Transit (d'Label Records), within The Millionairs

Collaborations 
2011: Aftenstemning (Ta:lik), with Norwegian traditional folk musician Camilla Granlien, including original written tunes and arrangements to poems by Bjørnstjerne Bjørnson

References

External links 

Mountain Dance by Kristin Sevaldsen on YouTube

1966 births
Musicians from Lillehammer
Living people
Norwegian jazz composers
Norwegian jazz saxophonists
21st-century saxophonists
Lillehammer University College alumni
Women jazz saxophonists